
Year 545 (DXLV) was a common year starting on Sunday (link will display the full calendar) of the Julian calendar. The denomination 545 for this year has been used since the early medieval period, when the Anno Domini calendar era became the prevalent method in Europe for naming years.

Events 
 By place 
 Byzantine Empire 
 Emperor Justinian I sends Narses, Byzantine general, to the rulers of the Heruli, to recruit troops for the campaigns in Italy and Syria.

 Europe 
 Gothic War: King Totila establishes his military base at Tivoli (Central Italy), and prepares a campaign to reconquer the region of Latium.
 The monastery of Clonmacnoise is founded in Ireland by Ciarán Mac a tSaor on the River Shannon (approximate date).

 Asia 
 Yangwon becomes ruler of the Korean kingdom of Goguryeo.

 Persia 
 King Khosrau I signs a five year truce with the Byzantine Empire, but war continues to ravage the Caucasus region, especially in Armenia.

 By topic 
 Religion
 The Synod of Brefi is held at Llanddewi Brefi, to condemn the Pelagian heresy. Dubricius, archbishop of South Wales, resigns his position in favour of David (approximate date).

Births 
 Abd Allah ibn Abd al Muttalib, father of Muhammad (d. 570)
 Fei Di, emperor of Northern Qi (d. 561) 
 Peter, Byzantine general (d. 602)

Deaths 
 October 12 – Mobhí Clárainech, Irish abbot and saint
 Stotzas, Byzantine rebel leader
 Approximate date
 Budic II, king of Brittany
 Laurence, bishop of Sipontum
 Medardus, bishop of Vermandois

References